Beaufort is a town in and the county seat of Carteret County, North Carolina, United States. Established in 1713 and incorporated in 1723, Beaufort is the fourth oldest town in North Carolina (after Bath, New Bern and Edenton).
On February 1, 2012, Beaufort was ranked as "America's Coolest Small Town" by readers of Budget Travel Magazine.

The population was 4,039 at the 2010 census. It is sometimes confused with a city of the same name in South Carolina; the two are distinguished by different pronunciations.

Beaufort is located in North Carolina's "Inner Banks" region. The town is home to the North Carolina Maritime Museum, the Duke University Marine Laboratory (Nicholas School of the Environment), and the National Oceanic and Atmospheric Administration (NOAA) Center for Coastal Fisheries and Habitat Research. It is also the location of the Rachel Carson Reserve, part of the N.C. Coastal Reserve and National Estuarine Research Reserve system.

History
The Beaufort Historic District, Carteret County Home, Gibbs House, Jacob Henry House, and Old Burying Ground are listed on the National Register of Historic Places. In June 1718 Blackbeard the pirate ran his flagship, the Queen Anne's Revenge and his sloop Adventure, aground near present-day Beaufort Inlet, NC. The Queen Anne's Revenge was added to the National Register of Historic Places in 2004 with the reference number 04000148. Thirty two years later, in August 1750, at least three Spanish merchantmen ran aground in North Carolina during a hurricane. One of the three, the El Salvador, sank near Cape Lookout.

Geography
Beaufort is located south of the center of Carteret County at  (34.7207, −76.6525). It is located on Beaufort Inlet, a channel leading south to the Atlantic Ocean. To the west is the tidal Newport River, separating the town from Morehead City. To the east is the unincorporated neighborhood of Lenoxville, extending to the North River, another tidal river.

U.S. Route 70 passes through Beaufort, leading west across the Newport River to Morehead City and northeast  to its end in the town of Atlantic.

Climate

Demographics

2020 census

As of the 2020 United States census, there were 4,464 people, 2,156 households, and 1,071 families residing in the town.

2008
As of the census of 2008, there were 4,189 people, 1,780 households, and 1,048 families residing in the town. The population density was 1,374.4 people per square mile (531.4/km2). There were 2,187 housing units at an average density of 797.1 per square mile (308.2/km2). The racial makeup of the town was 75.87% White, 19.99% African American, 0.37% Asian, 0.11% Native American, 0.05% Pacific Islander, 2.39% from other races, and 1.22% from two or more races. Hispanic or Latino of any race were 3.77% of the population.

There were 1,780 households, out of which 21.9% had children under the age of 18 living with them, 40.3% were married couples living together, 15.3% had a female householder with no husband present, and 41.1% were non-families. 35.5% of all households were made up of individuals, and 15.6% had someone living alone who was 65 years of age or older. The average household size was 2.07 and the average family size was 2.65.

In the town, the population was spread out, with 18.3% under the age of 18, 7.3% from 18 to 24, 27.9% from 25 to 44, 26.7% from 45 to 64, and 19.8% who were 65 years of age or older. The median age was 43 years. For every 100 females, there were 87.1 males. For every 100 females age 18 and over, there were 83.5 males.

The median income for a household in the town was $28,763, and the median income for a family was $39,429. Males had a median income of $30,859 versus $22,955 for females. The per capita income for the town was $19,356. About 13.3% of families and 16.6% of the population were below the poverty line, including 35.0% of those under age 18 and 10.4% of those age 65 or over.

Government
Beaufort uses a council-manager form of government. The community elects a mayor and five council members. Mayors serve two-year terms, and council members serve staggered four-year terms.

Education

K-12 education
Carteret County Public Schools is the county school district.

Zoned schools include:
 Beaufort Elementary School - There is also a former Beaufort Elementary Campus.
 Beaufort Middle School
 Beaufort students attend East Carteret High School, - located north of town
Charter schools include:
 Tiller School

Middle school

High school

Higher education
 Nicholas School of the Environment Marine Lab

Transportation

Highways
 US 70
 NC 101

Airport
 Michael J. Smith Field

Culture

Beaufort hosts several annual events, including:
 Beaufort Music Festival
 North Carolina Maritime Museum Wooden Boat Show
 BARTA Fishing Tournament
 Beaufort Pirate Invasion
 Beaufort Wine and Food Festival
Beaufort is also home to the Carteret County main public library.

Honors and designations
 On February 1, 2012, Beaufort was ranked as "America's Coolest Small Town" by readers of Budget Travel Magazine.
 Beaufort NC was named a 2015 Tree City USA by the Arbor Day Foundation in honor of its commitment to effective urban forest management.

Sister cities
According to Beaufort Sister Cities, Inc., the city of Beaufort has 19 sister cities:

  Beaufort, Victoria, Australia
  Beaufort, Haute-Garonne, France
  Beaufort, Hérault, France
  Beaufort, Isère, France 
  Beaufort, Jura, France
  Beaufort, Nord, France
  Beaufort-Blavincourt, France
  Beaufort-en-Argonne, France
  Beaufort-en-Santerre, France
  Beaufort-en-Vallée, France   
  Beaufort-sur-Doron, France
  Beaufort-sur-Gervanne, France
  Chapdes-Beaufort, France
  Montmorency-Beaufort, France
  Beaufort, County Kerry, Republic of Ireland
  Beaufort, Luxembourg
  Beaufort, Sabah, Malaysia
  Beaufort West, Western Cape, South Africa
  Beaufort, Wales, United Kingdom

See also
 Beaufort Historic Site
 National Register of Historic Places listings in Carteret County, North Carolina

References

External links

 
 
 Beaufort, NC info on InsiderInfo.Us
 NOAA Beaufort Laboratory

Populated places established in 1709
Towns in North Carolina
Towns in Carteret County, North Carolina
County seats in North Carolina
1709 establishments in North Carolina